Coccinia grandis, the ivy gourd, also known as scarlet gourd, tindora and kowai fruit, is a tropical vine. It grows primarily in tropical climates and is commonly found in the Indian states, where it forms a part of the local cuisine. Coccinia grandis is cooked as a vegetable.

In Southeast Asia, it is grown for its edible young shoots and edible fruits.

Names in other languages

Coccinia grandis is known as:
 कुन्द्रू (Kundru) or तेंडली (Tendli) in Hindi, Konkani, and Urdu
 ટીંડોરા (Tindora) in Gujarati
 तोंडली  (Tondli) in Marathi கோவை (Kovai) in Tamil
 കോവക്ക (Kovakka) in Malayalam
 దొండ కాయ / Donda kaya in Telugu
 ತೊಂಡೆ ಕಾಯಿ (Tonde Kayi) in Kannada
 তেলাকুচা (Telakucha) or কুঁঁদরি (Kũdri) or তোরুনি (Toruni) in Bengali
 କୁନ୍ଦୁରି (Bana-kunudri) in Odia
 কুন্দুলি (Kunduli) in Assamese
 Bimbika in Sanskrit
 Hoong Gua in Mandarin
 Manoli in Tulu
 Tilkor in Maithli
 Kowakka in Sinhala
  ស្លឹកបាស (Sloekbaas) in Khmer
  गोल काँक्री (Gol Kaakree) in Nepali
 Rashmato (English) in the United States
 Kunaru (Awadhi) in the Uttar PPrPradesh
 Dây bình bát, bình bát dây, dây bát, bát dây, bát bát, and mảnh bát in Vietnamese

Geographic spread

Its native range extends from Africa to Asia, including India, the Philippines, Cambodia, China, Indonesia, Malaysia, Myanmar, Thailand, Vietnam, eastern Papua New Guinea, and the Northern Territories, Australia. Its documented introduced range includes the Federated States of Micronesia, Fiji, Guam, Saipan, Hawaii, the Marshall Islands, Samoa, Tonga, and Vanuatu.

Seeds or fragments of the vine can be relocated and lead to viable offspring. This can occur when humans transport organic debris or equipment containing C. grandis. Once the ivy gourd is established, it is presumably spread by birds, rats, and other mammals.  In Hawaii, the fruit may be dispersed by pigs. Long-distance dispersal is most commonly carried out by humans due to its culinary uses or by mistake.
Regarded as very invasive and on the Hawaii State Noxious Weed List, ivy gourd can grow up to four inches per day. It grows in dense blankets, shading other plants from sunlight and highjacking nutrients, effectively killing vegetation underneath. It was introduced to Hawaii as a backyard food crop. It is sometimes tolerated along garden fences and other outdoor features because of its attractive white flowers. It has escaped to become a vigorous pest in Hawaii, Florida, Australia, and Texas. 

Botanical description
This plant is a perennial climber with single tendrils and glabrous leaves. The leaves have 5 lobes and are 6.5–8.5 cm long and 7–8 cm wide. The species is dioecious. Female and male flowers emerge at the axils on the petiole, and have 3 stamens.

Weed control
Both physical and chemical recommendations are made for control of the ivy gourd. Physical control requires pulling up plants by the roots, removing and destroying all stems and fruits, and subsequent policing of the area over several years to destroy (pull up by the roots and remove) seedlings as they sprout. Less rigorous hand-harvesting techniques can make infestations worse, to the point that chemical procedures are required, since plants are able to re-establish themselves from small stem pieces that touch the ground. When using chemical controls, that ivy gourd responded well to a thin-lined bark application of 100% Garlon 4 (triclopyr), leaving plants in place so as not to translocate the herbicide or spread the pest. It is applied multiple times until the vine dies. In Hawaii, several species of insect have been introduced with the purpose of being a biocontrol. Two weevils, Acythopeus burkhartorum and A. cocciniae, were introduced by the Department of Agriculture to Oahu and Hawaii. African vine moths  were also released onto Oahu and Maui. On the island of Maui, the A. cocciniae apparently is established and damaging leaves. The larvae feed on the plant and the adults chew holes in the leaves. The moth has yet to appear successful in its purpose.  

Medicinal value
In traditional medicine, fruits have been used to treat leprosy, fever, asthma, bronchitis, and jaundice. The fruit possesses mast cell-stabilizing, antianaphylactic, and antihistaminic potential. In Bangladesh, the roots are used to treat osteoarthritis and joint pain. A paste made of leaves is applied to the skin to treat scabies.

Ivy gourd extracts and other forms of the plant can be purchased online and in health food stores. These products are claimed to help regulate blood sugar levels. Some research supports that compounds in the plant inhibit glucose-6-phosphatase. Glucose-6-phosphatase is one of the key liver enzymes involved in regulating sugar metabolism. Therefore, ivy gourd is sometimes recommended for diabetic patients. Although these claims have not been supported, a fair amount of research on the medicinal properties of this plant are focusing on its use as an antioxidant, antihypoglycemic agent, immune system modulator, etc. Some countries in Asia, such as Thailand, prepare traditional tonic-like drinks for medicinal purposes.

Recipes

They are best when cooked, and are often compared to bitter melon. The fruit is commonly eaten in Indian cuisine. People of Indonesia and other Southeast Asian countries also consume the fruit and leaves. In U.S. cuisine, rashmatos are typically cooked and eaten during work lunches or dinners.  In Thai cuisine, it is one of the ingredients of the very popular clear soup dish  and some curries  curry and  curry.

In India, it is eaten as a curry, by deep-frying it along with spices, stuffing it with masala and sauteing it, or boiling it first in a pressure cooker and then frying it. It is also used in sambar'', a vegetable and lentil-based soup. The immature fruit is also used raw, preserving its crisp texture, to make a quick fresh pickle. Some people cut it into circles or, in a few cases, dice it up into smaller pieces.

Nutrition
Ivy gourd is rich in beta-carotene.

References

External links

Fruit vegetables
Fruits originating in Africa
Articles containing video clips
grandis
Bengali cuisine
Taxa named by Carl Linnaeus